Theta Eridani, Latinized from θ Eridani, is a binary system in the constellation of Eridanus with a combined apparent magnitude of 2.88. Its two components are designated θ1 Eridani, formally named Acamar  (the traditional name of the system), and θ2 Eridani. The system's distance from the Sun based on parallax measurements is approximately 165 light-years.

Nomenclature 
Theta Eridani is the system's Bayer designation; θ1 and θ2 Eridani those of its two components.

The system bore the traditional name Acamar, derived from the Arabic آخِر النَّهْر  Ākhir an-nahr, which means "the end of the river", via a Roman-alphabet handwriting misread "rn" to "m". In 2016, the International Astronomical Union organized a Working Group on Star Names (WGSN) to catalog and standardize proper names for stars. The WGSN decided to attribute proper names to individual stars rather than entire multiple systems. It approved the name "Acamar" for θ1 Eridani on 20 July 2016 and it is now so entered in the IAU Catalog of Star Names.

The term "Ākhir an-nahr", or "Achr al Nahr", appeared in the catalogue of stars in the Calendarium of Al Achsasi Al Mouakket, which was translated into Latin as Postrema Fluminis.

Historically, Acamar represented the end of the constellation Eridanus. Now that distinction is held by the star Achernar, which shares the same Arabic etymology. Achernar is not visible from the Greek isles (latitudes > 33° North), hence the choice of Acamar as the river's end during the time of Hipparchus and, later, Ptolemy.

Stellar system 
Theta Eridani is a binary system with some evidence suggesting it is part of a multiple star system. The main star, θ1 Eridani, is of spectral class A4 with a +3.2 apparent magnitude. Its companion star, θ2 Eridani, is of spectral class A1 with an apparent magnitude of +4.1. The angular separation of the two stars is equal to 8.3 arcseconds.

Ptolemy described Theta Eridani as a first-magnitude star, which some have taken to be, in fact, Achernar, which today appears just above the horizon in Alexandria where Ptolemy lived. Achernar, however, was not visible to Ptolemy (it is from Alexandria today due to precession); its declination in 100 CE was −67, making it invisible even at Aswan. Ptolemy's Eridanus, thus, without doubt, ended at Theta Eridani, which rose about 10 degrees above the horizon from Alexandria. This fact besides positively identifying Theta Eridani as the original "end of the river", also strengthens the case for it having been first magnitude in ancient times.

References

A-type main-sequence stars
Eridanus (constellation)
Eridani, Theta
CD-40 00771
018622
013847
0897
Acamar